The 1986 Balkans Cup was an edition of the Balkans Cup, a football competition for representative clubs from the Balkan states. It was contested by 8 teams and Slavia Sofia won the trophy.

Quarterfinals

|}

First leg

Second leg

Gloria Buzău won 3–0 on aggregate.

Iraklis Thessaloniki won 6–5 on aggregate.

Panionios won 6–3 on aggregate.

Semifinals

|}

First leg

Second leg

Panionios won 4–2 on aggregate.

Finals

|}

First leg

Second leg

Slavia Sofia won 5–3 on aggregate.

References

External links 

 RSSSF Archive → Balkans Cup
 
 Mehmet Çelik. "Balkan Cup". Turkish Soccer

1986
1985–86 in European football
1986–87 in European football
1985–86 in Romanian football
1986–87 in Romanian football
1985–86 in Greek football
1986–87 in Greek football
1985–86 in Bulgarian football
1986–87 in Bulgarian football
1985–86 in Turkish football
1986–87 in Turkish football
1985–86 in Albanian football
1986–87 in Albanian football